British penny may refer to:

Coins
 Penny (British decimal coin)
 Penny (British pre-decimal coin)
 Penny (English coin)

Units of currency